Johann Christoph Adelung (8 August 173210 September 1806) was a German grammarian and philologist.

Biography
He was born at Spantekow, in Western Pomerania, and educated at schools in Anklam and Berge Monastery, Magdeburg, and the University of Halle. In 1759 he was appointed professor at the gymnasium of Erfurt, but relinquished this situation two years later and went to reside in a private capacity at Leipzig, where he devoted himself to philological researches. In 1787 he received the appointment of principal librarian to the Elector of Saxony at Dresden, where he continued to reside until his death in 1806.

Work
The writings of Adelung are voluminous. By means of his excellent grammars, dictionary, and various works on German style, he contributed greatly towards rectifying the orthography, refining the idiom, and fixing the standard of his native tongue. His German dictionary Grammatisch-kritisches Wörterbuch der hochdeutschen Mundart (1774–1786) bears witness to the patient spirit of investigation which Adelung possessed in so remarkable a degree, and to his intimate knowledge of the different dialects on which modern German is based.

Shortly before his death, he issued Mithridates, oder allgemeine Sprachenkunde (1806). The hint of this work appears to have been taken from a publication with a similar title, published by Konrad von Gesner in 1555, but the plan of Adelung was much more extensive. Unfortunately, he did not live to finish what he had undertaken. The first volume, which contains the Asiatic languages, was published immediately after his death; the other two were issued under the superintendence of Johann Severin Vater (1771–1826). Of the very numerous works by Adelung, the following may be noted: Directorium diplomaticum (Meissen, 1802); Deutsche Sprachlehre für Schulen (Berlin, 1781), and the periodical, Magazin für die deutsche Sprache (1782–1784).

He believed strongly that the orthography of the written language should match that of the spoken language. He declared, "Write as you speak and read as it is written".

Notes

References

External links

Adelung, J. C., Grammatisch-kritisches Wörterbuch der Hochdeutschen Mundart

1732 births
1806 deaths
People from Vorpommern-Greifswald
People from the Province of Pomerania
Linguists from Germany
German lexicographers
German philologists
Grammarians from Germany
Linguists of German
Members of the Prussian Academy of Sciences
German male non-fiction writers
Kurdologists
18th-century lexicographers